Outright Distribution (formerly Screentime Partners) is a global TV distribution company headquartered in London and owned by Warner Bros. Television Productions UK.

Outright specialises in format and finished programme distribution. With an expanding library from Shed Media companies' content and growing quality third party business, Outright Distribution has a large catalogue of programme brands, selling over 2,000 hours in over 125 different territories worldwide.

In Broadcast magazine's Top Ten Most Used UK Distributors survey in March 2008, Outright Distribution was placed 7th.

Outright Distribution became part of the Shed Media Group in September 2006. On 5 August 2010, Warner Bros. Television secured a 55.75% stake in Shed Media. Warner Bros. completed its acquisition of a majority stake in Shed Media on 14 October. Under the deal, Shed Media will remain an independent company but Outright Distribution would be folded into the Warner's UK operation.

References

External links
Official Outright Distribution site

Television production companies of the United Kingdom
Warner Bros.